At Dawn and Dusk (1898) was the first collection of poems by Australian poet Victor Daley. It was released in Australia in hardback by Angus and Robertson in 1898, and also that same year in London by publishers James Bowden. 

The original collection includes 67 poems by the author that are reprinted from various sources, though they mainly originally appeared in The Bulletin.

Contents

Notes

The collection carried a dedication from the author as follows:

TO MY SISTER

In memory of our young days ashine
   With dreams, when life was yet an opening rose,
Take, Alice dear, this little book of mine,
   All made of dreams and dying sunset-glows,
A lonely bird that singeth far apart—
Yet shall sing sweeter in its home, your heart.

Critical reception

A reviewer in The Brisbane Courier opined that "Mr. Daley's book will be welcomed by every man and woman in Australia who can appreciate sweet thought clothed in faultless verse. So far there is nothing in the book which can lay claim to greatness, but there is in many parts of it work which has both of the qualities Matthew Arnold yearned for : "sweetness and light." Mr. Daley is a gifted and accomplished writer. His workmanship is in every way commendable. There is no occasion to despair of higher things while we have such singers."

In their review The Australian Town and Country Journal found much to like about the volume: "Mr. Daley takes a more ambitious flight than most of his Australian poetical contemporaries, as he possesses a keener sense of form, and a more delicate literary touch. He will, not, perhaps, achieve so wide a popularity as his brothers-in-verse, for he practically lacks that element of local color which is so profusely evident in most of their poems. He is a dreamer, given to looking backward and moralising; viewing the world more as a past than as a passing show, and therefore finding it particularly rich in regrets."

See also

 1898 in Australian literature
 1898 in poetry

References

Australian poetry collections
1898 books
Angus & Robertson books